Randal McGavock (1766–1843) was an American politician and Southern planter in Nashville, Tennessee. Identifying as a Jeffersonian Republican, he served as the Mayor of Nashville, Tennessee from 1824 to 1825.

His daughter Elizabeth married William Giles Harding of Nashville in 1840; he was a young widower and son of planter John Harding. He was running the 5300-acre Belle Meade Plantation and managing his father's slaves; in 1850 his father was ranked as the third-largest slaveholder in Davidson County, Tennessee.

Early life
Randal McGavock was born on June 20, 1766, in Rockbridge County, Virginia. His father was James McGavock Sr., and his mother, Mary (Cloyd) McGavock.

Career
McGavock served as Mayor of Nashville from 1824 to 1825.

In 1815, McGavock built Carnton. During the American Civil War, Carnton served as a field hospital after the Battle of Franklin. On December 1, 1864, four dead Confederate generals were laid on Carnton's gallery: Patrick R. Cleburne, Hiram B. Granbury, John Adams, and Otho F. Strahl.

Personal life
In February 1811, McGavock married Sarah Dougherty Rodgers, whose brother-in-law was Felix Grundy (1775–1840), U.S. Congressman from Tennessee, from 1829 to 1838, and 13th United States Attorney General, from 1838 to 1839. They  had four sons, James R., William, John, an unnamed infant son, and three daughters, Elizabeth, Mary Cloyd and an unnamed infant daughter.

In 1840, their daughter Elizabeth married Gen. William Giles Harding, heir and later owner of the Belle Meade Plantation, which was 5400 acres.

Their son John McGavock (1815–1893), who married Carrie Elizabeth Winder (1829–1905) in December 1848, inherited the Carnton plantation. His great-nephew, Randal William McGavock (1826–1863), the grandson of his brother Hugh, also became a politician. He served as Mayor of Nashville from 1858 to 1859, and died as a Confederate Lt. Col. in the Battle of Raymond.

His nephew, James McGavock, built Blue Fountain, now known as the McGavock-Gatewood-Webb House in East Nashville.

Death
McGavock died in September 1843. He is interred at Mount Olivet Cemetery in Nashville.

References

Sources
Carnton Plantation and Battlefield. Franklin, TN: The Battle of Franklin Trust. 2010.

1766 births
1843 deaths
People from Rockbridge County, Virginia
Mayors of Nashville, Tennessee
Tennessee Democratic-Republicans
American planters
McGavock family
American slave owners